Vasyutino is a rural locality (a village) in Roksomskoye Rural Settlement, Vashkinsky District, Vologda Oblast, Russia. The population was 15 as of 2002.

Geography 
Vasyutino is located 32 km northeast of Lipin Bor (the district's administrative centre) by road. Alferovo is the nearest rural locality.

References 

Rural localities in Vashkinsky District